The Rural Health Channel (RHC) was an Australian  channel which showcased non-commercial health related programs. It was owned by the Rural Health Education Foundation. RHC was broadcast on the free-to-view VAST platform. It began broadcasting programs on 21 May 2012.

The Foundation was for a long time the provider of most of Westlink's programming, and also had programming on NITV.

The channel used to broadcast documentaries, forums, programs and health education information on behalf of the government. It also carried content from different groups such as men's reproductive health body. Initially the foundation was funded to deliver eight continuing medical education programs to rural health and medical professionals by producing, broadcasting and distributing television-based distance learning.

In 2014 The Rural Health Education Foundation, the not-for-profit organization was forced to close the channel saying it was no longer financially viable following a reduction in government-contracted work.

The National Health Alliance continues to make available this resources online.

References 

Satellite television
2014 disestablishments in Australia
Television channels and stations disestablished in 2014
Defunct television channels in Australia